Sonic Syndicate is the fifth studio album by Swedish metalcore band Sonic Syndicate. It is the first album by the band to not feature former members Richard and Roger Sjunnesson. The album features guest appearance from Björn "Speed" Strid of Soilwork on the track "Before You Finally Break", marking as the first time the band has collaborated with another artist on a studio album. It is the final album to feature long-time bassist Karin Axelsson and drummer John Bengtsson.

Singles 
On May 16, 2014, the band released the album's first single, entitled "Black Hole Halo". The lyric video to the song was released on Nuclear Blast's official YouTube channel the same day.

Track listing

Personnel 
Band members
Nathan J. Biggs - clean vocals, harsh vocals
Robin Sjunnesson - guitar, harsh vocals
Karin Axelsson - bass guitar
John "Runken" Bengtsson - drums, percussion
Additional musicians
Björn Strid - guest vocals (5)

2014 albums
Sonic Syndicate albums
Nuclear Blast albums